Amy Murphy is a camogie player for Dublin and the St Mark's club and is a customer service advisor with Ulster Bank. Normally a full-forward, Murphy is a former Dublin Under 16 player of the year. She has five Leinster championship ladies football medals with Dublin at various grades and two All-Ireland runners-up medals.

References

External links
 Official Camogie website
 Dublin Camogie website

Year of birth missing (living people)
Living people
Dublin camogie players